Horseshoe Nunatak is a horseshoe-shaped nunatak in the Churchill Mountains of Antarctica, located  west of Mount Hoskins on the north side of the upper portion of Starshot Glacier. The nunatak was charted and descriptively named by the New Zealand Geological Survey Antarctic Expedition of 1964–65.

References

Nunataks of Oates Land